Gotts Park Mansion, formerly known as Armley House, is a Grade II listed country house in Armley Park, 3 miles from Leeds city centre. Formerly the home of industrialist Benjamin Gott, it is now the home of Gotts Park Golf Club.

The mansion was built in 1781 for Leeds merchant, Thomas Woolrick. Gott, a wealthy mill-owner, first leased the mansion then bought it in 1812. Gott commissioned Humphry Repton to improve the house and landscape. The mansion was then remodelled, partly to Repton's plan, by Robert Smirke, architect of the British Museum. Thus it became the first Greek Revival house built in West Yorkshire.

Gott's descendants lived in the mansion until the 1900s when, after the end of World War I, it was used as a hospital.

In 1928, the building and grounds were taken over by Leeds City Council on a 999-year lease, on the condition that they be used as a leisure space for the people of Leeds. Gotts Park Golf Club opened to the public on 8 April 1933.

References

Armley
Grade II listed buildings in Leeds